José María Robledo (born 7 July 1939) is an Argentine rower. He competed at the 1964 Summer Olympics and the 1968 Summer Olympics.

References

1939 births
Living people
Argentine male rowers
Olympic rowers of Argentina
Rowers at the 1964 Summer Olympics
Rowers at the 1968 Summer Olympics
Sportspeople from Rosario, Santa Fe
Pan American Games medalists in rowing
Pan American Games silver medalists for Argentina
Rowers at the 1967 Pan American Games